Charaxes alticola is a butterfly in the family Nymphalidae. It is found in the Democratic Republic of the Congo, Rwanda, and Uganda. The habitat is Afromontane forest.

The larvae feed on Arundinaria alpinus.

Taxonomy
The species is sometimes treated as a subspecies of Charaxes boueti. It is a member of the Charaxes cynthia species group.

References

van Someren, V.G.L. (1970). Revisional notes on African Charaxes (Lepidoptera: Nymphalidae). Part VI. Bulletin of the British Museum (Natural History) (Entomology)197-250. page 230, plate 6

External links
Images of C. alticola Royal Museum for Central Africa (Albertine Rift Project)
Charaxes alticola images at Consortium for the Barcode of Life 
African Butterfly Database Range map via search

Butterflies described in 1911
Taxa named by Karl Grünberg
alticola